Creston Valley Secondary School (named Prince Charles Secondary until 2021) is a public high school in Creston, British Columbia, Canada; part of School District 8 Kootenay Lake. The school provides a range of activities that students can enroll in, and many clubs as well.

See also
Monarchy in British Columbia

References

High schools in British Columbia
Educational institutions in Canada with year of establishment missing